Future boy(s) may refer to:

 Future Boy, alternative name of musician James Bourne
 Future Boy (song), from the 2001 album The Optimist LP by Turin Brakes
 Future Boy Conan, a Japanese anime series
 Future Boy Zoltron, an episode of the animated series Steven Universe
 Mirae (band), with Korean name referred as "Mirae Sonyeon", which means "Future boys" 
 The Future Boys Trilogy, a science fiction drama trilogy